T. princeps may refer to:
 Tipula princeps, a crane fly species in the genus Tipula
 Trachycarpus princeps, a palm species endemic to Yunnan in southern central China